Košarkaški klub Zabok is a professional basketball club based in Zabok, Croatia. It competes in the Croatian League.

History
The club was founded in 1977 under the name KK Ivo Lola Ribar after the World War II partisan hero. In 1981 club changed its name to the present one, KK Zabok.

External links

KK Zabok
Basketball teams in Croatia
Basketball teams established in 1977
Basketball teams in Yugoslavia